The Guatemalan myotis (Myotis cobanensis) is a species of vesper bat. It is found only in Guatemala.

References

Mouse-eared bats
Endemic fauna of Guatemala
Taxonomy articles created by Polbot
Mammals described in 1955
Bats of Central America